Halton is a village and former civil parish, now in the parish of Whittington, in the southern part of Northumberland, England. In 1951 the parish had a population of 24.

Halton Castle is a pele tower and grade I listed building.

Governance 
Halton was formerly a township and chapelry in Corbridge parish, from 1866 Halton was a civil parish in its own right until it was abolished on 1 April 1955 to form Whittington.

References

External links
GENUKI (Accessed: 27 November 2008) 

Villages in Northumberland
Former civil parishes in Northumberland